There were many terrorist attacks in Afghanistan in 2021. These attacks left at least 350 people dead and at least another 200 injured. The 
Taliban takeover of Kabul in August 2021 resulted in terrorist attacks increasing 42% in 2021 in Afghanistan compared to 2020.

Timeline of the attacks

See also
 List of terrorist incidents in 2021
 List of massacres in Afghanistan

References

Attacks
2020s crimes in Kabul
21st century in Baghlan Province
21st century in Balkh Province
21st century in Faryab Province
21st century in Ghor Province
21st century in Helmand Province
21st century in Herat Province
21st century in Jalalabad
21st century in Kandahar
21st century in Kunduz Province
21st century in Laghman Province
21st century in Logar Province
21st century in Nimruz Province
21st century in Parwan Province
21st century in Zabul Province
2021 attacks
April 2021 crimes in Asia
Attacks on buildings and structures in 2021
Attacks on buildings and structures in Kabul
Attacks on religious buildings and structures in Afghanistan
Building bombings in Afghanistan
Car and truck bombings in Afghanistan
Crime in Ghor Province
Crime in Helmand Province
Crime in Herat Province
Crime in Jalalabad
Crime in Kandahar Province
Crime in Kunduz Province
Crime in Logar Province
Crime in Parwan Province
Explosions in Jalalabad
Explosions in Kandahar Province
February 2021 crimes in Asia
Improvised explosive device bombings in 2021
Improvised explosive device bombings in Kabul
ISIL terrorist incidents in Afghanistan
January 2021 crimes in Asia
June 2021 crimes in Asia
June 2021 events in Asia
March 2021 crimes in Asia
Mass murder in 2021
May 2021 crimes in Asia
Mosque bombings in Asia
School bombings
School massacres in Asia
Taliban attacks
Taliban bombings
Attacks
2020s in Kabul